Natural Resources Canada (NRCan;) is the department of the Government of Canada responsible for natural resources, energy, minerals and metals, forests, earth sciences, mapping, and remote sensing. It was formed in 1994 by amalgamating the Department of Energy, Mines and Resources with the Department of Forestry. 

Under the Constitution Act, 1867, primary responsibility for natural resources falls to provincial governments, however, the federal government has jurisdiction over off-shore resources, trade and commerce in natural resources, statistics, international relations, and boundaries. The department administers federal legislation relating to natural resources, including energy, forests, minerals and metals. The department also collaborates with American and Mexican government scientists, along with the Commission for Environmental Cooperation, to produce the North American Environmental Atlas, which is used to depict and track environmental issues for a continental perspective. 

The current minister of natural resources is Jonathan Wilkinson. The department is governed by the Resources and Technical Surveys Act and the Department of Natural Resources Act.

Structure
The department currently has these sectors:

Corporate Management and Services Sector
Land and Minerals Sector
Strategic Policy and Innovation Sector
Low Carbon Energy Sector
Energy Technology Sector
Strategic Petroleum Policy and Investment Office
Canadian Forest Service
Indigenous Affairs and Reconciliation Sector
Office of the Chief Scientist
Major Projects Management Office
Communications and Portfolio Sector
Corporate Management and Services Sector
Legal Services
Audit and Evaluation Branch
Geographical Names Board of Canada
Space Weather Canada

The following sub-agencies are attached to the department:
Canadian Forest Service
Northern Pipeline Agency Canada
Canadian Energy Regulator
Canadian Nuclear Safety Commission
Atomic Energy of Canada Limited

Related legislation
Acts for which Natural Resources Canada has responsibility

Arctic Waters Pollution Prevention Act
Canada Foundation for Sustainable Development Technology Act
Canada Labour Code
Canada Lands Surveyors Act
Canada Lands Surveys Act
Canada-Newfoundland Atlantic Accord Implementation Act
Canada-Nova Scotia Offshore Petroleum Resources Accord Implementation Act
Canada Oil and Gas Operations Act
Canada Petroleum Resources Act
Canadian Energy Regulator Act
Canadian Ownership and Control Determination Act
Cape Breton Development Corporation Act
Cape Breton Development Corporation Divestiture Authorization and Dissolution Act
Cooperative Energy Act
Department of Natural Resources Act
Energy Administration Act
Energy Efficiency Act
Energy Supplies Emergency Act
Explosives Act
Export and Import of Rough Diamonds Act
Forestry Act
Hibernia Development Project Act
International Boundary Commission Act
Northern Pipeline Act
Nuclear Energy Act
Nuclear Fuel Waste Act
Nuclear Liability Act
Nuclear Safety and Control Act
Oil Substitution and Conservation Act
Resources and Technical Surveys Act

Not in force
Greenhouse Gas Technology Investment Fund Act

See also

EnerGuide for Houses
Canada Green Building Council
List of Canadian Ministers of Natural Resources
R-2000 program

Notes

References

External links

Natural Resources Canada Map Publication Website

 
Federal departments and agencies of Canada
Energy in Canada
Canada
Canada
Ministries established in 1842
Canada
Forestry agencies in Canada
1842 establishments in Canada
Mining in Canada